Just Dance is a South Korean television series starring Park Se-wan and Jang Dong-yoon. It is based on a documentary of the same name which aired on KBS1 in 2017 and was awarded "Best Educational Show" during the 54th Baeksang Arts Awards. Produced by MI Inc. for KBS, it aired on KBS2's Mondays and Tuesdays at 22:00 KST time slot from December 3 to December 25, 2018.

Synopsis
In a Girls' Vocational High School in Geoje, six students dream to win a dancesport competition.

Cast

Main
 Park Se-wan as Kim Shi-eun
 Jang Dong-yoon as Kwon Seung-chan

Supporting

Dance Sports Club
 Lee Joo-young as Park Hye-jin
 Joo Hae-eun as Yang Na-young
 Shin Do-hyun as Lee Ye-ji
 Lee Yoo-mi as Kim Do-yeon
 Kim Su-hyeon as Kim Young-ji
 Moo Hye-in as the dance sports club captain
 Jang Yi-jung as Min-joo
 Hong Seung-hee as Kim Joo-hyun

Teachers
 Kim Kap-soo as Lee Kyu-ho
 Jang Sung-bum as Han Dong-hee
 Park Soo-young as the vice principal

People around Shi-eun
 Kim Sun-young as Park Shi-young (Shi-eun's mother)
 Song Ji-in as Kim Shi-ra (Shi-eun's sister)

Others
 Jang Hyun-sung as Kwon Dong-seok (Seung-chan's father)
 Lee Chung-mi as (cameo)
 Yeon Jae-hyeong as Lee Tae-Sun
 Moon Sook as Hye Jin's grandmother (Ep. 8, 10)
 Son Woo-hyeon

Production
Just Dance reunites Jang Dong-yoon and Park Se-wan who previously worked together in School 2017.

The first script reading was held on September 20, 2018 at KBS Annex Broadcasting Station in Yeouido with the attendance of cast and crew.

Original soundtrack

Part 1

Part 2

Part 3

Ratings
 In this table,  represent the lowest ratings and  represent the highest ratings.
 N/A denotes that the rating is not known.

Awards and nominations

Notes

References

External links
  
 
 
 

Korean Broadcasting System television dramas
Korean-language television shows
2018 South Korean television series debuts
2018 South Korean television series endings
South Korean teen dramas
South Korean high school television series
Television series about teenagers